The San Diego Seals are a lacrosse team based in San Diego, California. The team plays in the National Lacrosse League (NLL). The 2019 season is their inaugural season in the NLL.

Regular season

Final standings

Game log

Regular season
Reference:

Playoffs

Roster

See also
2019 NLL season

References

San Diego
San Diego Seals seasons
San Diego Seals